The Canadian Forces School of Military Engineering (CFSME), located at CFB Gagetown in Oromocto, New Brunswick, is responsible for the conduct of 85 different courses that span all ranks and occupations within the Combat Engineering and Construction Engineering organizations. CFSME is the Canadian Forces Centre of Excellence in military engineer Training.

Originally A6 Canadian Engineering Training Centre, the school was established in Camp Dundurn in Saskatchewan and then moved to Chilliwack, British Columbia, to train military engineers for the Canadian Army during the Second World War.  The A6 Canadian Engineering Training Centre was renamed the Royal Canadian School of Military Engineering.

In 1968 Canada unified its military forces when it merged the Canadian Army, Royal Canadian Air Force and Royal Canadian Navy to create the Canadian Forces. The Royal Canadian School of Military Engineering was renamed the Canadian Forces School of Military Engineering following unification.  It also found itself responsible for the military engineering training for all services and components of the Canadian Forces.   On the closing of CFB Chilliwack in the late 1990s the school moved to its current location in CFB Gagetown.

The school exists as a unit of the Combat Training Centre and it consists of the following sub-units:
 Field Engineering Training Squadron (FETS)
 Construction Engineering Training Squadron (CETS)
 Reserve Engineer Training Squadron (RETS)
 Tactics Squadron
 Construction Engineering and Management Squadron (CEMS)
 Explosive Ordnance Disposal Squadron (EOD)
 Standards and Training Development Squadron (STDS)
 Administration Squadron

Canadian Armed Forces
 
1968 establishments in New Brunswick
Engineering units and formations of Canada
Canadian Armed Forces education and training establishments
Military education and training in Canada